Oberea trilineata is a species of beetle in the family Cerambycidae. It was described by Chevrolat in 1858. It contains the varietas Oberea trilineata var. nigrosternalis.

References

Beetles described in 1858
trilineata